Fernando Inchauste (18 June 1930 – 13 May 2006) was a Bolivian sprint canoer and sports shooter who competed from the mid-1960s to the early 1970s. As a sprint canoer, he was eliminated in the repechage round of the K-1 1000 m event at the 1964 Summer Olympics in Tokyo. Four years later in Mexico City, Inchauste did not finish his heat of the K-1 1000 m event.

In the 1972 Summer Olympics in Munich, he finished 86th in the small-bore rifle, prone event.

References

1930 births
2006 deaths
Sportspeople from La Paz
Bolivian male canoeists
Bolivian male sport shooters
Canoeists at the 1964 Summer Olympics
Canoeists at the 1968 Summer Olympics
Olympic canoeists of Bolivia
Olympic shooters of Bolivia
Shooters at the 1972 Summer Olympics